Mississippi Highway 145 (MS 145) is the designation for the parts of the old U.S. Route 45 (US 45) roadbed that the state continues to maintain or has designated. Those ten sections travel through Waynesboro, near Boice, through Shubuta, from De Soto to Meridian, through Shuqualak, through Macon, through Aberdeen, through Nettleton, from Shannon to Booneville, and through Corinth.

Waynesboro

US 45 was fully rerouted out of Waynesboro in 2004, and the old alignment became MS 145.

MS 145 begins south of town at an intersection with US 45. It heads north through rural and wooded areas before entering the city limits as Mississippi Drive and passing through neighborhoods. The highway then passes through downtown, where it has an intersection with MS 184, before passing through business district and some more neighborhoods. MS 145 passes through more rural areas to have an interchange with US 84 to leave Waynesboro and continue north through wooded areas to come to an end at another intersection with US 45. The entire route of MS 145 is a two-lane highway.

Boice

The section of MS 145 near the unincorporated community of Boice, Wayne County is a  two-lane road. The highway is not signed with standard highway markers, the only references to the highway number are on small street signs at its two ends at US 45. The highway is not maintained by the Mississippi Department of Transportation (MDOT) past the limits of the intersections with US 45.

Shubuta

By 2001, US 45 bypassed Shubuta, and MS 145 was created for US 45's old routing.

MS 145 begins south of town at an intersection with US 45. It heads north through rural wooded areas to have an intersection with MS 510 before curving to the northwest to cross a bridge over the Chickasawhay River. The highway then crosses a bridge over som e railroad tracks before entering Shubuta and passing straight through downtown along High Street. MS 145 continues northwest to leave Shubuta and pass through farmland before coming to an end at another intersection with US 45. The entire route of MS 145 is a two-lane highway.

De Soto–Meridian

Beginning in 1994, US 45 was upgraded to a divided highway outside Meridian. The old alignment continued to be in the state highway system. All of US 45's former routing in Lauderdale County became part of MS 145 in 1998. Two years later, US 45 was realigned onto a new divided highway in Clarke County, and old sections of US 45 became signed as MS 145.

MS 145 begins in Clarke County at an intersection with US 45 just south of De Soto. It heads north to pass through the community as a two-lane highway before having an interchange with US 45. The highway leaves De Soto and passes through rural areas for several miles to become concurrent with MS 18 and cross the Chickasawhay River to enter Quitman. MS 145/MS 18 pass through a business district along Archusa Avenue before entering and having an intersection with MS 512, where MS 18 splits off and heads east. MS 145 continues north through neighborhoods, where it has an intersection with MS 513, before winding its way through rural areas for the next several miles, where it crosses US 45 several times, passes by Clarkco State Park, crosses in Lauderdale County, and passes through the community of Wolf Springs. The highway then enters the Meridian city limits and passes through neighborhoods along Roebuck Drive, where it widens to four-lane undivided highway shortly before coming to an end at an interchange with I-20/I-59 (US 11/US 80/MS 19; Exit 53), with the road continuing northwest into downtown as 22nd Avenue.

Shuqualak

MS 145 begins just south of town at an intersection with US 45. It heads north through rural areas for a short distance to enter Shuqualak at an intersection with MS 21/MS 39. It bypasses downtown along its east side, passing through neighborhoods before leaving Shuqualak and continuing north through rural areas for a few miles before coming to an end at another intersection with US 45. The entire route of MS 145 is a two-lane highway.

Macon

By 1998, MS 145 was created after US 45 bypassed the town of Macon.

MS 145 begins just south of town at an intersection with US 45. It heads north through wooded areas, running parallel to the Noxubee River, for a few miles to become concurrent with MS 14 and cross a bridge over the river to enter Macon. The highway immediately passes through downtown along Jefferson Street, where MS 14 splits off onto Adams Street, before continuing north through neighborhoods for several miles. MS 145 the leaves Macon and continues through rural areas before coming to an end at another intersection with US 45. The entire route of MS 145 is a two-lane highway.

Aberdeen

MS 145 was created in 2000 after US 45 was rerouted to a new divided highway outside Aberdeen.

MS 145 begins on the east side of town at an intersection with US 45/MS 8/MS 25 along the banks of the Tombigbee River. It heads west to immediately pass through downtown along Commerce Street before passing through neighborhoods and curving to the north. The highway then passes through a business district before coming to an end at another intersection with US 45. Excluding a short section between James Street and Matubba Street, the entire route of MS 145 is a two-lane highway.

Nettleton

After US 45 was upgraded to a divided highway outside of Nettleton, MS 145 was designated along the former routing.

MS 145 begins on the south side of town in Monroe County at an intersection with US 45/US 278. It heads north through neighborhoods before turning northwest to pass through a business district and enter downtown, where it comes to an intersection with W Main Street (unsigned MS 774), a connector to MS 6, where it crosses into Lee County. The highway then passes through more neighborhoods before coming to an end at another intersection with US 45/US 278. The entire route of MS 145 is a two-lane highway.

Shannon–Booneville

US 45 was rerouted onto a freeway in Tupelo in 1977, no longer going through downtown Tupelo. The freeway was extended north and south in 1982 and 1984, and more of US 45 was moved. By 1986, the freeway extended as far as Shannon. About ten years later, US 45 was moved to a divided highway for Lee and most of Prentiss County, and the old alignment became MS 145.

MS 145 begins in Lee County in the eastern part of Shannon at an interchange between US 45, US 45 Alternate, and US 278. It heads northwest as a two-lane highway to bypass downtown along Noah Curtis Street before turning north along Romie Hill Avenue at an intersection with MS 245. The highway leaves Shannon and crosses over a creek to enter Verona along Raymond Avenue. MS 145 widens to a four-lane undivided highway as it passes through industrial areas before passing through downtown. It passes through neighborhoods before crossing into Tupelo at an intersection with US 278/MS 6 (Pontotoc Parkway). The highway heads north through a business district (along Gloster Street), where it has an intersection with South Green Street (unsigned MS 769), before crossing over a creek and reaching an intersection with Main Street that includes a railroad crossing diagonally across it. Continuing north though a business district, it has an interchange with McCullough Boulevard, MS 178, and MS 145 continues north to have another intersection with Green Street (MS 769) before leaving Tupelo, crossing a creek and passing under I-22/US 78. MS 145 narrows to two-lanes and has an interchange with the Natchez Trace Parkway before entering Saltillo and passing a business district before having an interchange with US 45. It bypasses downtown to the northwest, having intersections with MS 363 (Mobile Street) and MS 766 (N 3rd Street) as it passes through neighborhoods, before leaving Saltillo and passing through rural areas. It passes through Guntown, where it has an intersection with MS 348, before passing through Baldwyn, where it has a concurrency with MS 370 and crosses into Prentiss County.

MS 145 continues northeast through rural areas for several miles, where it passes just west of Wheeler and have an intersection with MS 362, to have an interchange with MS 30 and enter Booneville. It becomes 2nd Street as it widens to four-lane undivided highway and passes through neighborhoods and straight through downtown. The highway then passes through a business district, where it has an intersection with MS 4, before crossing a creek and narrowing to two-lanes to leave Booneville and pass through rural areas before coming to an end at another intersection with US 45.

Corinth

MS 145 was designated as the old routing of US 45 through Corinth in 1998.

MS 145 begins just south of town at an intersection with US 45. It heads northeast to enter the city limits along Tate Street to pass through some industrial areas to have an intersection with US 72 before passing through a business district and crossing a railroad track to enter downtown. The highway then turns north along Fillmore Street, at an intersection with MS 785, and crosses another railroad track to continue north through downtown and pass through neighborhoods. MS 145 then makes a left turn onto Main Street for a short distance before turning right onto Polk Street. It continues north through neighborhoods for several miles before passing through rural areas, where it has an intersection with MS 2. The highway continues north through rural areas before coming to the Tennessee state line, where the road continues north into Guys, TN as Old US Highway 45 S. The entire route of MS 145 is a two-lane highway. The portion of the road north of its southern terminus and north of downtown Corinth is not maintained by the state.

See also

References

External links

145
U.S. Route 45
Transportation in Wayne County, Mississippi
Transportation in Clarke County, Mississippi
Transportation in Lauderdale County, Mississippi
Transportation in Noxubee County, Mississippi
Transportation in Monroe County, Mississippi
Transportation in Lee County, Mississippi
Transportation in Prentiss County, Mississippi
Transportation in Alcorn County, Mississippi